Ch. Nazar Muhammad Gondal (born April 15, 1950) is a Pakistani politician, a former Federal Minister for Capital Administration & Development. He received his bachelor's degree in Legislation and Law (LL.B). Gondal joined PTI (Pakistan Tehrik.e.Insaf)on June 6, 2017. He also served as head of Pakistan Badminton Association and as head of other public offices.Gondal has been three times elected MNA, once District Chairman.  Gondal is one of the founders of Mandi Bahauddin.

Political career 
He has been elected as Member National assembly  
He is politically affiliated with Pakistan Tehreek-e-Insaf (PTI). He is a lawyer and a farmer by profession.. He was appointed as Parliamentary Secretary for Establishment Division.
Nazar Muhammad Gondal was also elected as the Nazim of Mandi Bahauddin District from 2001 to 2004. He won the February 18 general elections from NA-109, Mandi Bahaudin-II on ticket of PPPP. He was victorious over Pakistan Muslim League candidate Nasir Iqbal Bosal.

Gondal also serves as the president of the Pakistan Badminton Federation, which was suspended by the Badminton World Federation over claims by two parallel formed federations run by Nazar Mohammad Gondal and Mian Iftikhar Hussain Shah. Gondal also has served as Food and Agriculture Minister from 2010 to 2013 and Minister of Narcotics from 2008 to 2010. Gondal won the elections for three consecutive five-year terms 1993-1996, 2002, and 2008. Gondal's brother won the seat against Pervaiz Elahi (former CM Punjab).

References

Sources
 http://www.pakistanherald.com/Profile/Nazar-Muhammad-Gondal-211

Living people
1950 births
People from Pind Dadan Khan
Pakistan People's Party MNAs
Punjabi people
Pakistani lawyers
Mayors of places in Pakistan
People from Mandi Bahauddin District
Badminton in Pakistan
Nazar Muhammad
Politicians from Jhelum